Anolis allogus, the Spanish Flag anole or Bueycito anole , is a species of lizard in the family Dactyloidae. The species is found in Cuba.

References

Anoles
Reptiles of Cuba
Endemic fauna of Cuba
Reptiles described in 1919
Taxa named by Thomas Barbour